Marie Henriksson (born 17 June 1955) is a Swedish female curler and curling coach.

She competed at the 1988 Winter Olympics when curling was a demonstration sport.

In 1988 she was inducted into the Swedish Curling Hall of Fame.

Teams

Women's

Mixed

Record as a coach of national teams

References

External links
 

Living people
1955 births
Swedish female curlers
European curling champions
Swedish curling champions
Curlers at the 1988 Winter Olympics
Olympic curlers of Sweden
Swedish curling coaches
20th-century Swedish women